Bagerdan-e Sofla (also Romanized as Bāgerdān-e Soflá; also known as Bāgerdān) is a village in Mangur-e Sharqi Rural District, Khalifan District, Mahabad County, West Azerbaijan Province, Iran. At the 2006 census, its population was 163, in 30 families.

References 

Populated places in Mahabad County